Hadley Township may refer to:

 Hadley Township, Lafayette County, Arkansas, in Lafayette County, Arkansas
 Hadley Township, Pike County, Illinois
 Hadley Township, Michigan
 Hadley Township, St. Louis County, Missouri, in St. Louis County, Missouri
 Hadley Township, Chatham County, North Carolina, in Chatham County, North Carolina

Township name disambiguation pages